Dinaritoidea is an extinct superfamily of ammonoids in the order Ceratitida.

References

External links 
 
 

 
Ceratitida superfamilies